The Cambridge Branch (officially named the Hautapu Branch since 2011) is a rural railway line in the Waikato, New Zealand. The line stretchs from Ruakura Junction for 15.08 km to the settlement of Hautapu, having previously continued another 4.19km to the township of Cambridge. It had five stations along its length, at Newstead, Matangi (Tamahere), Bruntwood (Fencourt), Hautapu and the terminus at Cambridge.

Passenger service on the line ceased on 9 September 1946, although during the 1950 British Empire Games at Auckland three passenger trains took 1,500 people to the rowing events held on the nearby Lake Karapiro on 7 February. There were occasional excursions, such as those celebrating the centennial in 1984. In 2020 reopening of the branch to passengers was put forward as a COVID-19 recovery scheme. Cost was estimated at up to $150m, including relaying tracks to Cambridge.

History 
In the late 1870s the need for a railway line to the flourishing town of Cambridge had been noted and a Cambridge Railway Committee formed, after the Government had rejected 'Breakell's Line', an earlier name for the Cambridge Branch, which had been surveyed in 1879. The Committee had a  line from Rukuhia surveyed in 1880, which would have bridged the Waikato at the Narrows. Preliminary surveying for the current branch was conducted in 1881.

The line starts at Ruakura Junction on the East Coast Main Trunk, where the first sod was turned in the line's construction on 6 May 1882.

A kilometre south of the Newstead Station a five span timber bridge was needed to cross the Mangaonua Stream, and a contract to lay the permanent way over the full distance was let on 21 February 1884 at the price of £5,455.

On the morning of 1 October 1884 the line was inspected and passed ready for traffic. On 6 October a special train brought the new station master and his family along with other members of the staff to Cambridge and two days later the line was open for traffic.

Cambridge railway yard 

The Cambridge railway yard was located on a tract of land between Queen Street and Lake Te Ko-outu and crossed at its entrance by Lake Street.
Railway infrastructure originally included a Class 3 station building, goods shed and crane, locomotive shed, turntable and stockyards. The rail yard consisted of main line, crossing loop, four sidings, goods shed siding, backshunt, turntable and locomotive depot, stockyard and private sidings.

Cambridge yard was protected by both 'Home' and 'Distant' semaphore signals controlled via gainstock levers located at the station building. Four NZR built railway staff houses were also located on Queen Street bordering the railyards.

The locomotive depot was removed at some point during the 1920s but the turntable remained and was occasionally used until the early 1970s when it was dismantled and filled in. During the 1940s construction of the Karapiro Dam and Hydro scheme (9 km east of Cambridge) necessitated the construction of a new siding and Public Works building in the yard site.

Heavy materials, machinery, steel and cement used in the construction of the dam were railed direct to Cambridge and then transported further by truck to Karapiro. This new siding left the Main just within the Home Signal boundary and passed along the outer limits parallel to the yard to the large Public Works warehouse.

Various private sidings were also used for the carriage of sawn timber, wood and wool products by local industries.

The station yard employed a mixture of 'Wynn-Williams' spring-loaded points, lockable switch points, ground-throw turnouts and also had trap-points/de-railers located on and protecting both the Public Works Siding, Crossing Loop and Number One Siding.

The old station building was sold and broken up in 1973 and an overhead crane was erected in its place to handle container traffic from Weddell Crown Aotearoa freezing works in Leamington. With the removal of the station building administration was subsequently moved and conducted from an office added to the Goods Shed. As a result, both the 'Home' and 'Distant' signals were fixed in the stop position. In the late 1970s following the removal of the stockyards the stockyard site was used for the washing and drying of N.Z.R tarpaulins on purpose built drying racks.

As shown in the table and graph, passenger traffic peaked in 1922, after a more frequent bus started running in 1920 –

Other stations
The following stations were located on the Cambridge Branchline with distances in kilometers measured from Ruakura Junction.

Newstead (2.57 km) 
Newstead (originally named Mongonui) was the first station located on the branch line after leaving the East Coast Main Trunk. It originally had a platform and shelter type station building, crossing loop and one siding. Owing to the demise of passenger traffic and increase in road cartage of goods the station was removed although the loop was used at times to store retired wagons even into the 1980s.

Matangi (7.47 km) 
Tamahere (in 1906 renamed Matangi) was once an important station on the branchline with a large dairy factory requiring both inwards consignments of coal and also supplying outwards dairy freight. The station yard included a crossing loop, 3 sidings, Goods Shed siding and also a siding for the dairy factory.

Bruntwood (12.88 km) 
Bruntwood (previously Fencourt) was the site of a dairy factory and had a siding curving off the branch mainline and into the factory site.

Hautapu (15.08 km) 
Previously the last station before Cambridge and current terminus of the railway. Hautapu has had a dairy factory since the 1880s and has a long tradition with using rail for outbound freight movement. The railway line intersects through the middle of the  factory grounds and it is this convenience that has ultimately insured the lines survival. In the late 1980s expansions to the dairy factory and the construction of a new bulk refrigerated storage facility required the branch 'Main' to be diverted and new rail sidings built. Hautapu railyard comprises the Main line, elongated loop, three sidings, backshunt and 'Cool Store' siding with rail access on either side of the building.

The Hautapu factory currently still generates enough traffic to justify regular services and two trains daily in peak dairy season.

Operation 
In the early days regular services on the Cambridge branch were mixed (passenger and freight), stopping where or when required. The exception was the midday train which carried passengers only. The service was increased to two trains a day in 1902. Connections were made at Frankton Junction with services on the North Island Main Trunk. There were dairy factories located at Matangi and Bruntwood (Fencourt) and Hautapu requiring inwards supplies and sending outwards goods. During the 1920s, motor vehicles started to take over the passenger traffic and the last time-tabled passenger train left Cambridge without ceremony on 9 September 1946.

At one stage a loading bank for the Cambridge Raceway was located on the branch Main, adjacent to the racetrack grounds near the Taylor Street level-crossing, for the loading and unloading of race horses on important race days. Freight traffic continued with common goods carried including wood, coal, wool, meat, cars, fertiliser and grain. In 1973 a gantry-type container crane was erected in the station yard for the truck to train transition of containerised refrigerated meat from the Weddell Crown freezing works in Leamington.

With the closure of the freezing works in 1993 the traffic originating from Cambridge declined with the only remaining customer being Summit Grains. Summit Grains occupied the former Public Works warehouse in the station yard and used rail for inbound shipments of bulk grain and horsefeed until early 1999 when the section from Hautapu to Cambridge was officially closed and subsequently lifted and removed.

Wartime traffic
The Cambridge Branch Line played a small part during World War Two for the transport of bulk aircraft fuel. In 1942 a top-secret fuel storage facility consisting of a bulk fuel tank, underground pipelines and tunnels codenamed 'AR-9' was built in the area directly adjacent and below the rail yards beside Lake Te Koutu. This RNZAF facility was designed to stockpile aircraft fuel for use by the air force at Rukuhia south of Hamilton. With the very real threat of Japanese invasion it was constructed in secrecy with tank trains reportedly unloading fuel at night.

Motive power

Like all New Zealand branch lines in the 1880s the Cambridge Line was first serviced by small tank engines. Due to axle-load and weight restrictions imposed by both rail weight and the Mangaonua Steam bridge, mainline locomotives have always been forbidden to operate on the line.
By the 1940s the B and Bb Class engines were prevalent and by the 1950s the AB class 4-6-2 was the main loco employed on Cambridge Branch trains. With the dieselization of the New Zealand Railways network in the late 1950s and 1960s a mix of steam and diesel motive power became common. The last steam engine to run on the line was AB 733 on Monday 26 June 1967, and in 1990 the line averaged about four shunts per day.

In the 1970s the main locomotives working the Cambridge Branch were diesels of the classes DI, DB and DSC. By the 1980s and through the 1990s until the Hautapu-Cambridge sections closure, the majority of trains were pulled by DBR class engines. At various times a small shunting engine of the class TR was used to perform various shunting duties and was housed in the Goods Shed at Cambridge. All trains that currently use the line to Hautapu are DBR or DC hauled.

Today

In the following months after the closure of the Hautapu-Cambridge section of line in 1999 all the yard and line tracks were quickly lifted and Goods Shed dismantled. The Samson Post was moved to the new terminus of the line at Hautapu. The 'Home' semaphore signal remained in position until being moved to the grounds of the Cambridge Museum where it is currently on display along with the 18 km and 19 km distance markers. The 'Cambridge' sign marking the entrance to the yard and also the 'Kissing Gates' of 1884 vintage remain preserved in place. The line formation is still very evident as a vacant plot of land stretching in a straight line to Hautapu for 4 km between Victoria Road East and Victoria Road West and tree-lined within the town boundary. In 2010 KiwiRail required that the railway designation remain in place to protect the potential for the line to carry freight and passengers in future.

All evidence of the railway yard has been erased with exception of a loading bank, the stockyard platform and the remains of the locomotive inspection pit on the site of the old loco depot.

In early 2015 the old 3-hectare yard was put up for tender after the last business Summit Grains moved from the former public works warehouse site, In early 2016 details were released by Hamilton-based Trig Group of a multi-million dollar development called Lakewood Cambridge, with the construction of at least half a dozen building starting in June 2017. The development makes way for new housing and shops in the two story buildings with the rest of the space being turned into a large carpark with no unique tips to the sites rail history.

On the 16th of August 2017 construction of a new roundabout and the relocation of the kissing gates were completed in relation to completion of the Waikato Expressway Cambridge bypass and Lakewood Cambridge development of the Cambridge railway yard.

VTNZ is still in 2017 operating in the grounds of the old rail yard.

In 2020 double tracking and potentially reopening the Cambridge station for events, were put forward as a COVID-19 recovery scheme, as part of a $150m scheme to relay tracks to Cambridge.

Official name 
From its first opening the line was generally referred to using variations of the 'Cambridge Railway' or 'Cambridge Branch', and in 1977 the name 'Cambridge Branch Railway' was reconfirmed as the official name in The New Zealand Gazette. In 1996 the line officially became the 'Cambridge Industrial Siding' (sometimes erroneously referred to as the 'Cambridge Industrial Line') before becoming the 'Hautapu Branch' in 2011. It has also been called the 'Cambridge / Hautapu Industrial Siding'.

The former section from Hautapu to Cambridge is still officially gazetted as being the 'Cambridge Industrial Siding', though the official record does note that the tracks have been removed.

References

Citations

Bibliography

External links
 Cambridge Museum - Railway

Railway lines in New Zealand
Rail transport in Waikato
Railway lines opened in 1884
Railway lines closed in 1999
Cambridge, New Zealand
3 ft 6 in gauge railways in New Zealand
1884 establishments in New Zealand
1999 disestablishments in New Zealand
Closed railway lines in New Zealand